Rashid Riyadh Al-Ameeri (born 29 June 1967) is a Bahraini athlete. He competed in the men's hammer throw at the 1992 Summer Olympics.

References

External links

1967 births
Living people
Athletes (track and field) at the 1992 Summer Olympics
Bahraini male hammer throwers
Olympic athletes of Bahrain
Place of birth missing (living people)